{{Infobox biography
| name               = Francis Parker Yockey
| image              = Francis_Parker_Yockey.jpg
| caption            = Yockey 
| birth_name         = 
| birth_date         = 
| birth_place        = Chicago, Illinois, U.S.
| death_date         = 
| death_place        = San Francisco, California, U.S.
| occupation         = Author, attorney
| signature          = 
| alma_mater         = University of Arizona (BA)Notre Dame Law School (JD)
| other_names        = Ulick Varange
| notable_works      = Imperium: The Philosophy of History and Politics
}}
Francis Parker Yockey (September 18, 1917 – June 16, 1960) was an American fascist and pan-Europeanist ideologue. A lawyer, he is known for his neo-Spenglerian book Imperium: The Philosophy of History and Politics, published in 1948 under the pen name Ulick Varange, which was dedicated to Adolf Hitler and called for a neo-Nazi European empire.

Yockey supported far-right causes around the world and remains an influence of white nationalist and neo-fascist movements. Yockey was an antisemite, revered German Nazism, and was an early Holocaust denier. In the 1930s he contacted or worked with the Nazi-aligned Silver Shirts and the German-American Bund. He served in the U.S. Army in 1942–43, and went AWOL to help Nazi spies. After
legal appointments in Detroit in 1944–45, he worked for eleven months on the War Crimes tribunal in Germany before he either resigned or was fired for siding with the Nazis. In London, he worked for the British fascist Oswald Mosley's Union Movement, and after falling out with Mosley, founded the breakaway European Liberation Front in 1949, leading it until it fizzled around 1954.

During the Cold War, Yockey reportedly worked with Soviet bloc intelligence, and argued for a tactical far-right alliance with the Soviets against what he saw as Jewish-American hegemony. He also briefly wrote anti-Jewish propaganda in Egypt, where he met its president Gamal Abdel Nasser. Yockey remained influential in fascist circles until his suicide in FBI custody in 1960. Yockey's last visitor in prison was Willis Carto, who became the leading advocate and publisher of his writings.

Biography
Yockey had many aliases, and some facts about him are not certain. Acquaintances and declassified FBI files described him as a talented speaker, brilliant, well-read, sometimes charming, humorous and a gifted mimic — but also haughty, immature, secretive, a loner, and, in the FBI's words, "nervous, high-strung, erratic, unpredictable and dictatorial", with "an amazing capacity for alienating people".

 Early life and education 
Yockey was born in 1917 in Chicago, Illinois, the youngest of four siblings in an upper-middle-class Catholic family of Irish and German descent. His biographer Kevin Coogan noted that Yockey may have been one-quarter Jewish. His father was a stockbroker. Yockey was raised in Ludington, Michigan. He learned classical piano.

He began study as an undergraduate at the University of Michigan, then to transfer to Georgetown University, before completing at the University of Arizona, before starting law school at Northwestern University, also studied law at De Paul University, and graduated from the Notre Dame Law School in 1941. In college, he declared he would not dine with black, Jewish or communist students.

Yockey had been attracted to Marxism in early life  before gravitating to Adolf Hitler and Nazism in the 1930s, and in college, Oswald Spengler. Another influence was the Nazi theorist Carl Schmitt, whom Yockey was later accused of plagiarizing. Yockey joined pro-German and pro-fascist groups in the late 1930s. In 1938, his essay "The Tragedy of Youth" was published in Social Justice, a journal known for publishing antisemitic tracts that was distributed by the "radio priest" Charles Coughlin. In 1939 Yockey spoke at a gathering of Silvershirts.

 World War II and postwar 
Yockey enlisted in the U.S. Army in 1942, serving in an intelligence unit. He went AWOL from his camp in Georgia in November 1942 on a Nazi mission to Texas and Mexico City. According to Yockey's biographer Kevin Coogan, Yockey secretly helped German Nazi spies who had landed in the United States and Mexico. Yockey received an honorable discharge from the Army for "dementia praecox, paranoid type" in 1943 after suffering a nervous breakdown or feigning one. He was placed on a government list of Americans suspected of pro-Nazi views. In 1944 he became an assistant prosecuting attorney for Wayne County, Michigan, but was bored by the work, leaving in 1945.

In early 1946, Yockey found a job with the United States War Department in Wiesbaden, Germany, as a post-trial review attorney for the Nuremberg Trials, and he moved to Germany with his wife and two daughters. Evidence suggests Yockey may have tried to help accused Nazi war criminals including SS General Otto Ohlendorf by sharing top-secret documents with German defense lawyers. Often absent from his job, he was fired for "abandonment of position" on the 26th of November 1946, when it was noticed that he was siding with the Nazis. He agitated against Allied occupation of Germany, and later worked for the Red Cross in Germany but deserted his post. U.S. intelligence began tracking Yockey in Germany in 1946 or 1947. Yockey left his estranged wife and daughters in Germany in 1947 for exile in Ireland. 

Yockey was a central figure in early postwar Nazi networks. Over time, he contacted or worked with far-right figures and organizations including the German-American Bund, the National German-American Alliance, William Dudley Pelley's Silver Shirts, Sir Oswald Mosley's Union Movement, George Sylvester Viereck, the American H. Keith Thompson, Gerald L. K. Smith, and James H. Madole's National Renaissance Party. After the war Thompson and Madole became advocates of Yockey's worldview and published some of his essays.

 Cold War years 
Yockey identified the United States, not Russia, as Europe's main enemy, urged Europeans not to collaborate with America in the Cold War, and wanted to act against American forces in Germany and England. He hoped to weaken or overthrow the government of the United States. Yockey's ideas were usually embraced only by those who could countenance an alliance between the far left and the far right. The American Nazi Party of George Lincoln Rockwell rejected Yockey's anti-American attitude and willingness to work with anti-Zionist communist governments and movements. (Yockey told Willis Carto that he had never heard of the ANP when Carto visited him in prison in 1960.) Other neo-Nazis such as Rockwell's ally Colin Jordan disagreed with Yockey's views on race, and saw Yockeyism as advocating a "New Strasserism" which would undermine Nazism.

Without notes, Yockey wrote his first book, Imperium: The Philosophy of History and Politics, in Brittas Bay, Ireland, over the winter and early spring of 1948. Imperium is a Spenglerian critique of 19th century materialism and rationalism that scorns democracy and equality, extols Nazism, and blames Jews for various problems. It subscribes to Spengler's suggestion that Germany had been destined to fulfil the 'Roman' role in Western Civilization by uniting all its states into one empire. It is dedicated to "the hero of the Second World War", intended to describe Adolf Hitler.Theodore J. O'Keefe of the Journal of Historical Review makes this assertion in his review of Kevin Coggan's 1999 study of Yockey. According to the late Doris Foster Lessard, a historian for many years in Ludington, Michigan, this information about Imperium was apparently known to Ludington residents of Yockey's parents' social circle. In an early example of Holocaust denial, it also claims that the Nazis' gas chambers were faked, even though in private Yockey praised the Holocaust against the Jews. Yockey mailed copies of Imperium to far-right figures in Europe and America. Views expressed in it were endorsed by former Nazi General Otto Remer (who had been Hitler's bodyguard); the American Revilo P. Oliver; and Italian esotericist Julius Evola.

Yockey became embittered with Sir Oswald Mosley (Hitler's leading British proponent) after the latter refused to publish or review Imperium upon its completion, after having promised to do so. Mosley punched Yockey in the nose during a dispute in London's Hyde Park. With a small group of British fascists including the former Mosleyites Guy Chesham and John Gannon, Yockey formed the European Liberation Front (ELF) in 1948–49. The ELF formed ties with old Nazis along with other fascists. It issued a newsletter, Frontfighter, and in 1949 published Yockey's virulent anti-American, anti-communist and anti-semitic text The Proclamation of London, which called for a reinstatement of Nazism and the expulsion of the Jews (whom it labeled "the Culture-distorter") from Europe. The ELF was opposed by other neo-fascist groups and essentially disappeared by 1954 due to members being alienated by Yockey's imperious personality.

Declassified FBI files show that Yockey traveled to Los Angeles, San Francisco, and New York to collaborate with ultra-right activists, while eluding FBI agents who sought to question him. As a fugitive he spoke at the 1950 Christian Nationalist Party convention in Los Angeles organized by Gerald L. K. Smith. He also spent time in New Orleans writing propaganda for use in Latin America. His intercepted letters to other fascists in the 1950s were often signed "Torquemada" after the torturer of the Spanish Inquisition. 

Yockey was approached by the group around the anti-Communist Senator Joseph McCarthy in 1951. He was asked to ghost-write a speech for McCarthy which stressed the importance of greater friendship between Germany and the United States, although McCarthy never delivered it as the theme of the speech, when it was announced, aroused a great deal of controversy. 
 
Yockey collaborated with Soviet bloc intelligence, traveled behind the Iron Curtain, and was suspected of visiting East Germany, the Soviet Union and Cuba. He wrote with approval of antisemitic purges in the Eastern bloc countries. In late 1952, he traveled to Prague and witnessed the Prague Trials, and asserted that they "foretold a Russian break with Jewry". He became a Czech Secret Service courier.

Yockey met Egyptian President Gamal Abdel Nasser, whom he called "a great and vigorous man", in Cairo in 1953. He worked briefly for the Egyptian Information Ministry, writing anti-Zionist propaganda. In the Arab world, he made contact with Nazi exiles including Otto Ernst Remer and Johann von Leers. Yockey reportedly tried to persuade Nasser to finance development of a cobalt bomb by ex-Nazi scientists.

Yockey was known as a womanizer. In 1957, FBI agents assessed that he was "living in Los Angeles as a pimp or a gigolo" and had written pornography for money, including a sadomasochistic booklet called Arduous Figure Training at Bondhaven that was later found in his suitcase. The 62 pages booklet was published by Nutrix Company of Jersey City and according to the FBI "contained numerous sketeches of partially clad females and [...] was of a masochistic or sadistic nature."

 Arrest and death 
After more than a decade of pursuit by the FBI, Yockey was finally arrested in 1960 after returning to the United States from abroad. En route to Oakland, California, his suitcase (by varying accounts) had either been lost or had broken open at the Dallas airport, and authorities found several of Yockey's falsified passports and birth certificates. When this was reported to the federal government, the FBI tracked Yockey down in Oakland, California, and arrested him. While in prison, he was visited by Carto, who later became the chief advocate and publisher of Yockey's ideas. Yockey was soon after found dead with an empty cyanide capsule nearby while in a jail cell in San Francisco under FBI supervision, leaving a note in which he claimed that he was committing suicide in order to protect the anonymity of his political contacts. Writing after his suicide, the San Francisco Chronicle declared him "as important a figure in world Fascism as we now know."

Influence
While some postwar European and American nationalists of the post-war period sided with the United States against communism, or in other cases argued for third positionism, Yockey argued for a red-brown alliance (red representing the far-left and brown representing the far-right). He argued that rightists should aid the spread of communism and Third World anti-colonial movements when they threatened the United States. This view did not have a very significant influence on the American right, which in the Cold War for the most part remained anti-communist and liberal. He had a greater impact in Europe, where the European New Right, including the Belgian Jean Thiriart, the Russian Aleksandr Dugin, and French writers Alain de Benoist and Guillaume Faye, adopted positions similar to Yockey's, although there is little evidence his work influenced them in this. He also influenced American Nazi Party members Dan Burros and James H. Madole.

Yockey is also remembered as an early and influential Holocaust denier.

Yockey's present influence is reflected mostly through the work of Willis Carto and his Liberty Lobby and successor organizations. According to Stephen E. Atkins, "Because of the efforts of Carto, Yockey is more popular after his death than he ever was when he was alive".  Carto ran the Youth for George Wallace group supporting segregationist George Wallace's 1968 presidential campaign. That group formed the basis for the National Youth Alliance, which promoted Yockey's political philosophy and his book Imperium. Core members of Carto's political groups were members of the Francis Parker Yockey Society, a neo-Nazi cult. Afterward, Yockey continued to be a cult figure among neo-fascists. His influence also persists among Odinists. According to the American political scientist George Hawley, "Yockey's vision of a global fascist movement that transcends national borders is now a common trope within the Alt-Right".

In his 2011 book of correspondences with American conductor David Woodard, Swiss writer Christian Kracht recommended Yockey's Imperium. The following year, Kracht published his bestselling novel Imperium.

 See also 
 Far-right politics
 Oswald Spengler

References 
Informational notes

Citations

Bibliography
 Yockey, Francis Parker (2013) Imperium, London: Abergele: The Palingenesis Project (Wermod and Wermod) 
 Imperium (1948) by Francis Parker Yockey, e-book
 Yockey, Francis Parker (2012) The Proclamation of London. Shamley Green:The Palingenesis Project  Yockey, Francis Parker and Oliver, Revilo P. The Enemy of Europe by Francis Parker Yockey and  
Oliver's section, 2nd section, 3rd, 4th, 5th, and 6th

Further reading
 
 Lee, Martin A. (2000) The Beast Reawakens New York: Little, Brown and Company 
 Mintz, Frank P. Mintz (1985) The Liberty Lobby and the American Right: Race, Conspiracy, and Culture''.  Westport, Connecticut:Greenwood Press

External links 
 Dave Emory's For The Record broadcast #237 Interview with Kevin Coogan
 Dave Emory's For The Record broadcast #354 Interview with Kevin Coogan
 Francis Yockey's FBI files, obtained under the FOIA and hosted at the Internet Archive:
 part 1
 part 1a
 part 2
 part 3
 Chicago Office files

1917 births
1960 suicides
1960 deaths
American collaborators with Nazi Germany
Antisemitism in the United States
American neo-fascists
Anti-Masonry
American anti-communists
American political writers
American neo-Nazis
American Holocaust deniers
Fascist writers
Former Marxists
Theorists on Western civilization
American male non-fiction writers
American people who died in prison custody
20th-century American non-fiction writers
20th-century American lawyers
Walsh School of Foreign Service alumni
University of Michigan alumni
Notre Dame Law School alumni
Writers from Chicago
American expatriates in Ireland
Suicides by cyanide poisoning
Third Position
20th-century American male writers
Anti-Zionism in the United States
Prisoners who died in United States federal government detention